The 50th Annual Japan Record Awards took place at the New National Theatre in Shibuya, Tokyo, on December 30, 2008, starting at 6:30PM JST. The primary ceremonies were televised in Japan on TBS.

Performers 
Wink
Kome Kome Club
Aki Yashiro
Shinichi Mori

Awards winners 
 Japan Record Award:  - Ti Amo
 Artist: Exile
 Songwriter and Composer: Kiyoshi Matsuo
 Composer and Arranger Jin Nakamura
 Record companies: Avex Entertainment
 Best Vocal Performance: Mitsuko Nakamura - Onna no Tabiji
 Best New Artist: Jero - Umiyuki
 Best album: Namie Amuro - Best Fiction

Nominees

Japan Record Awards 
Thelma Aoyama feat. SoulJa — "Soba ni Iru ne"
Junko Akimoto — "Ai no mama de" (愛のままで...)
W-inds. — "Ame Ato" (アメあと)
Exile — "Ti Amo"
Cute (°C-ute) — "Edo no Temari Uta II"
Kumi Koda — "Moon Crying"
Kazuyoshi Saito — "Ya Mujō" (やぁ 無情)
Nana Tanimura — "Jungle Dance"
Tohoshinki — "Dōshite Kimi o Suki ni Natte Shimattandarō?"
Kiyoshi Hikawa — "Genkai Funauta" (玄海船歌)
Kaori Mizumori — "Wajima Asaichi" (輪島朝市)
Mihimaru GT — "Girigiri Hero"

Best New Artist 
Girl Next Door
Jero
Kimaguren
Mai Fukui
Kumiko Sakurai

See also 
59th NHK Kōhaku Uta Gassen

External links
Official Website

Japan Record Awards
Japan Record Awards
Japan Record Awards
Japan Record Awards
2008